Edward Daniel Legge (12 March 1902 – 16 December 1947) was a Scottish footballer who played for Carlisle United and York City in the Football League.

Career
Born in Aberdeen, Legge played for Balmoral Cecil and Aberdeen Park Vale before signing for hometown club Aberdeen in 1928. He joined Carlisle United of the Football League in 1932 and in the league he made 104 appearances and scored one goal for them before joining York City in November 1935 following a trial. He was made captain for the 1936–37 season. Following an injury, he was unable to reaffirm his place in the team, with Claude Barrett and Jack Pinder playing regularly at full back, and he left to join Burton Town in 1938. He joined former club Aberdeen Park Vale in 1938 and died at Foresterhill Hospital in Aberdeen on 16 December 1947 at the age of 45.

References

1902 births
1947 deaths
Footballers from Aberdeen
Scottish footballers
Association football defenders
Aberdeen F.C. players
Carlisle United F.C. players
York City F.C. players
English Football League players
Scottish Football League players